The Fauna Foundation is the only chimpanzee sanctuary in Canada. Located just outside Chambly, on the South Shore of Montreal, the story of Fauna started in 1990 by Gloria Grow and Dr. Richard Allan on their  farm. Later in 1997, it became the Fauna Foundation. Its primary objective, the rescue and care of chimpanzees who have been used in research, began in the wake of the shutdown of LEMSIP.

It is the first sanctuary to accept chimpanzees with HIV.

In 2012, author Andrew Westoll won the Charles Taylor Prize for his non-fiction book The Chimps of Fauna Sanctuary, detailing his encounters with the chimpanzees at the foundation.

In August 2013, chimpanzees Loulis and Tatu from the Chimpanzee and Human Communication Institute (CHCI) moved to the sanctuary.

Fauna Sanctuary Inc, is a registered 501(c)(3) not-for-profit charity in the United States.

References

External links
Official site

Organizations based in Montreal
Organizations established in 1997
Primate sanctuaries
Animal welfare organizations based in Canada

501(c)(3) organizations